Nancy Maria Donaldson Johnson (28 December 1794 – 22 April 1890) was awarded the first US patent for a hand-cranked ice cream freezer in 1843.

Biography 
Johnson was born in 1794 to Dr. Lothario Donaldson and Mary 'Polly' Rider in New York. Little else is known about her actual past, however she is assumed to have been born in New York, Maryland, or Pennsylvania. Together with her sister Mary she volunteered for the American Missionary Association. Walter Rogers Johnson (1794-1852) and Nancy Donaldson got married at Medfield, Massachusetts, in 1823. The couple adopted two children, Walter W. Johnson (1836-1879) and Mary Maria Stroud (1834-1921). Her husband Walter was a scientist and the First Secretary for the American Association for the Advancement of Science.

She started as a housewife, and later went on to be a very successful inventor, which was very uncommon in her days. During this time, women’s legal identities were taken away when they married, according to the laws of coverture. Women were not allowed to control their own finances, own property, or sign legal agreements. This was all done by the men. Men were looked at to represent their wives, mothers, and daughters. Nancy Johnson was a social empowerer and taught women of the era that they can make their own way for themselves. 

Nancy Johnson lived in Philadelphia in 1843 when she filed for her patent for the first hand-cranked ice cream churn (US3254A). Her simple invention launched a “disruptive technology” that made it possible for everyone to make quality ice cream without electricity. This technology changed the way that ice cream was made forever and continues to be used today.

Starting in 1862 Nancy and her sister Mary taught freed slaves in South Carolina, as part of the Port Royal Experiment. She died in Washington, D.C., in 1890. The family is buried at Oak Hill Cemetery (Washington, D.C.).

Invention of the ice cream maker 
Johnson had invented the hand cranked ice cream churn as a way to solve the problem of the amount of time it took to make ice cream. Ice cream was originally made using very intensive labor and it often took one individual hours to make. Johnson essentially provided another way to make ice cream faster and easier than by hand.

Originally, there were many steps to creating ice cream. President Thomas Jefferson had an eighteen step recipe to make ice cream. This all changed when Johnson created her patent. 

The patent number for the Artificial Freezer is US3254A.  It was patented on September 9th, 1843, and antedated on July 29th, 1848.  The Artificial Freezer contained a hand crank, which, when cranked, would spin and rotate two adjacent broad, flat slates containing an array of holes, which would assist in churning the ice cream, making the ice cream more uniform, while also making it easier to remove the ice crystals in the interior walls of the cylindrical container in which the spatulas were fit in.  These metal spatulas were attached to this pipe called the “dasher”, which was attached to the handle crank protruding out from the Artificial Freezer.  Harnessing the principles of thermodynamics and endothermic reactions, Johnson’s Artificial Freezer was very effective in making ice cream. The wooden tub contained a mixture of salt and crushed ice, thus melting the crushed ice, but dropping the temperature of the solution below freezing point as a result of salt lowering the melting point of liquids. This, in conjunction with the ice cream solution, extracts heat energy from the ice cream, in turn freezing it.  Johnson also was able to create the Artificial Freezer so that when using a border to split the machine down the middle, two different flavors of ice cream could be cranked and made at the same time.

In the "artificial freezer", which was the name of the original patent, it was possible to make either ice cream or sorbet, that would last about 30 minutes. There were no electric solutions to keep things cool, as the refrigerator had not been invented and not everybody had an icebox. 

With these elements combined, it made it much easier, more efficient, and less labor-intensive for ice cream parlors to produce ice cream.  Thus, a more efficient solution made it cheaper to produce ice cream, which in turn, made the ice cream cheaper.  This granted accessibility to this dessert across all economic classes, which previously was too expensive for middle and lower classes as the production of the ice cream made it too expensive. In September of 1846, she filed a patent for this Ice cream maker and revolutionized ice-cream making, allowing it to become a commodity that one could easily make and sell. Johnson’s innovation revolutionized the ice cream industry. Ice cream is now one of the most popular desserts worldwide, and it wouldn’t be this popular today if it wasn’t for the churn. Prior to this invention, ice cream was a rare treat which was enjoyed primarily by those of the upper class. It was a treat; not feasible to have every day. In order to eliminate the labor intensive work required to make ice cream, Johnson created a system that allowed the ingredients to be agitated without human intervention. No longer did someone need to spend hours manually stirring the mixture. 

Over 150 years later, and Johnson’s invention is still used today, e.g. a very similar model is still widely used in Guadeloupe and Martinique, which is often referred to as  "West Indian Ice Cream Maker".

The seemingly simple technology behind her idea has been utilized and improved over the decades to become what it is today. With all of the new improvements and the increasing popularity, ice cream has now grown to become a huge industry. It is a treat across America and around the world. Without Johnson’s hand cranked ice cream churn, ice cream would not be a common dessert enjoyed by many, but rather a dessert limited to only those of the upper class. Johnson received $1500 during the course of her life for her patent. She made her final changes to her patent on September 9th, 1843. Despite Johnson’s success and future impact she had with the Artificial Freezer, she sold the rights of the patent to William G. Young, a Baltimore native, who then improved on the ice cream freezer on May 30th, 1848.  Johnson sold the rights of the patent to Young for $200.  Some of the improvements included a similar internal spatula covered with holes, however, the mechanics of the handle were changed make the ice cream much cooler, also simultaneously speeded up the process of freezing. Today, ice cream is one of the most popular desserts in the world. Without Nancy Johnson's invention, the ice cream industry would not be where it is today. In 2019, about 6.4 billion pounds of ice cream and frozen yogurt were made in the U.S. Also, the ice cream industry has a major impact on the U.S. economy as it generates about 28,800 jobs and about $1.8 billion dollars in direct wages.

References

External links 
Patent US3254A

1794 births
1890 deaths
19th-century American inventors
Women inventors
Burials at Oak Hill Cemetery (Washington, D.C.)